Berezhany urban hromada, also known as Berezhany Hromada (translit. Berezhanska hromada) is a hromada of Ukraine, in Ternopil Raion of Ternopil Oblast. Its administrative center is Berezhany. Population: 

Until 18 July 2020, the hromada belonged to thecity of oblast significance of Berezhany. As part of the administrative reform of Ukraine, which reduced the number of raions of Ternopil Oblast to three, the city was merged into Ternopil Raion.

Subdivisions and Population
Berezhany City Council
city Berezhany
 Baranivka
 Bishche
 Hynovychi
 Zhovnivka
 Zhukiv
 Zaluzhzhia
 Komarivka
 Krasnopushcha
 Kuropatnyky
 Lisnyky
 Nadrichne
 Pidlisne
 Plikhiv
 Poruchyn
 Posukhiv
 Potutory
 Rai
 Urman
 Shybalyn
 Yasne

Notes:
 v. stands for village

Head
Rostyslav Bortnyk — the mayor of Berezhany, the head of the hromada

References

External links

Berezhany city community. Gromada.info.

 
2018 establishments in Ukraine